Curio (stylized as CURIO) was a Japanese pop rock band formed in 1995. They were best known to Western audiences for their song "Kimi ni Fureru Dake de", which was used as the third opening theme for the popular anime Rurouni Kenshin.

Members
Nob - Vocals, Saxophone
Born October 26, 1973.  Following the dissolution of Curio, Nob has appeared as a guest vocalist with the ska band Ska-Show. He was arrested in 2000 for methamphetamine use.
Kassai - Guitarist
Currently working in Okinawa as a graphic designer with the 3PO Design Workshop.
Britain - Drummer, Programming

Former Members
Aja - Guitarist
Left the band in 2001.  Following this, he joined the ska band One Track Mind as a guitarist.

Discography

Maxi Singles
Go Around The World - August 21, 2002
Clover - October 17, 2002
Blanket - October 29, 2003

Albums
 Hybrid - August 21, 1997 (re-released April 25, 2007)
 Sweet & Bitter - July 29, 1998 (re-released April 25, 2007)
 Pawky - July 28, 1999 (re-released April 25, 2007)
 Raison d'etre - December 21, 2001
 Glitters - November 7, 2002
 Best Bang! (Best Album) - December 18, 2002

External links
 Nob's Show-Ska blog 
 3PO Design Workshop 
 Britain artist biography at Hip Land Music Corporation Inc. 

Japanese pop rock music groups
Japanese rock music groups
Musical groups from Osaka
Epic Records artists